The 2004 Big Ten softball tournament was held at Alumni Field on the campus of the University of Michigan in Ann Arbor, Michigan, from May 13 through May 15, 2004. As the tournament winner, Michigan State earned the Big Ten Conference's automatic bid to the 2004 NCAA Division I softball tournament. As the eighth-seed, Michigan State became the lowest-seeded team to win the tournament.

Format and seeding
The 2004 tournament was an eight team single-elimination tournament. The top eight teams based on conference regular season winning percentage earned invites to the tournament.

Tournament

All-Tournament Team
 Sarah Baumgartner (Illinois)
 Amanda Fortune (Illinois)
 Lindsey Hamma (Illinois)
 Jessica Beech (Michigan State)
 Natalie Furrow (Michigan State)
 Brittney Green (Michigan State)
 Angel Merren (Michigan State)
 Kristen Amegin (Northwestern)
 Eileen Canney (Northwestern)
 Carri Leto (Northwestern)
 Kristi DeVries (Ohio State)
 Megan Schwab (Ohio State)

Tournament MVP
 Brittney Green (Michigan State)

References

Big Ten softball tournament
Tournament
Big Ten softball tournament